is a Japanese football player. She plays for Omiya Ardija Ventus in the WE League. She also plays for the Japan national team.

Club career
Sakaguchi was born in Sakai on October 15, 1987. In 2003, at the age of 15, she debuted in the L.League at Speranza FC Takatsuki. After graduating from high school, she joined Tasaki Perule FC in 2006. She was selected Best Eleven in 2007. However, the club was disbanded in 2008 due to financial strain. She went to the United States and joined USL W-League club FC Indiana in 2009. In 2010, she returned to Japan and joined Albirex Niigata. She was selected Best Eleven in 2011. In 2012, she moved to Nippon TV Beleza. She was selected MVP awards for 3 years in a row (2015-2017). She was also selected Best Eleven for 5 years in a row (2013-2017).

National team career
In July 2006, Sakaguchi was selected to be on the Japan national team for the 2006 Asian Cup. At this competition, on July 19, she debuted and scored 2 goals against Vietnam. She played in the 2011 World Cup where Japan won the championship; Sakaguchi scored one of the penalties in the shootout against United States in the final. She also played in the 2015 World Cup where Japan came second. She was also part of the silver medal-winning 2012 Summer Olympic team. From June 2016, she was given the number 10 shirt for Japan by new manager Asako Takakura. She played 124 games and scored 29 goals for Japan until 2018.

Club statistics

National team statistics

Honors
 Teams
 FIFA Women's World Cup
 Champion: 2011
 Runner-up: 2015
 Asian Games
 Gold Medal: 2010
 Silver Medal 2006
 EAFF Women's Football Championship
 Champion: 2008
 Empress's Cup
 Champion: 2007
 Individual
 L.League
 Best Eleven: 2007, 2011, 2013

See also
 List of women's footballers with 100 or more caps

References

External links

Japan Football Association

1987 births
Living people
Association football people from Osaka Prefecture
Japanese women's footballers
Japan women's international footballers
Nadeshiko League players
USL W-League (1995–2015) players
Speranza Osaka-Takatsuki players
Tasaki Perule FC players
Albirex Niigata Ladies players
Nippon TV Tokyo Verdy Beleza players
Japanese expatriate footballers
Japanese expatriate sportspeople in the United States
FIFA Women's World Cup-winning players
2007 FIFA Women's World Cup players
2011 FIFA Women's World Cup players
2015 FIFA Women's World Cup players
Olympic footballers of Japan
Olympic medalists in football
Olympic silver medalists for Japan
Medalists at the 2012 Summer Olympics
Footballers at the 2008 Summer Olympics
Footballers at the 2012 Summer Olympics
Asian Games gold medalists for Japan
Asian Games silver medalists for Japan
Asian Games medalists in football
Medalists at the 2006 Asian Games
Medalists at the 2010 Asian Games
Medalists at the 2014 Asian Games
Footballers at the 2006 Asian Games
Footballers at the 2010 Asian Games
Footballers at the 2014 Asian Games
FIFA Century Club
Women's association football midfielders
People from Sakai, Osaka
F.C. Indiana players
2019 FIFA Women's World Cup players
Nadeshiko League MVPs